Randy Boyd may refer to:

Randy Boyd (politician) (born 1954), member of the Mississippi House of Representatives
Randy Boyd (ice hockey) (1962–2022), Canadian ice hockey defenceman
Randy Boyd (writer), American novelist